Gun Blaze West (stylized as GUN BLAZE WEST) is a Japanese manga series written and illustrated by Nobuhiro Watsuki. It was serialized in Shueisha's shōnen manga magazine Weekly Shōnen Jump from December 2000 to July 2001, with its chapters collected in three tankōbon volumes. The story follows Viu Bannes, a young gunfighter on his journey towards Gun Blaze West, the place where the greatest gunmen go to test their strength. Viz Media published the series in English in North America.

Plot
"Gun Blaze West" is considered to be a place of legend where everyone, lawmen and outlaws, would be able to live in peace without fear of violence. The journey to Gun Blaze West may only be undertaken at the end of every decade ("Zero Year"), but each hopeful must first earn the "Sign To West", an item with the Gun Blaze West insignia that is only valid on the year it is acquired.

The series begins in 1875 in Illinois with the introduction of Viu Bannes, a nine-year-old boy who wins a gun belt in an arm-wrestling competition. Viu encounters a wandering drifter named Marcus Homer, who trains Viu to become stronger by having him race as far as he can to a cliff in the distance, and tells him he will be strong enough to reach Gun Blaze West when he can reach that cliff before the sun sets. When Illinois is attacked by the Kenbrown gang, its three underlings are defeated by Viu and Marcus, but Kenbrown himself overwhelms the town's defenders at an abandoned fort. Marcus challenges Kenbrown to a one on one duel and is killed. Viu, having witnessed his friend's death, is enraged and defeats Kenbrown himself. Marcus's revolver had a "Sign to the West" on its handle, and hidden inside the gun was part of a map to Gun Blaze West. Viu decides to take it with him.

Five years later, Viu having completed his training, is now able to move at superhuman speed. He begins his journey to Gun Blaze West with Marcus's revolver as his only weapon. He soon arrives at St. Louis, where he is invited into a shabby saloon whose business has been falling due to the saloon across the street. It is run by a man named Carlo who uses his thugs, in particular a shotgun wielder named Target Kevin, to intimidate people into going to his saloon and avoiding others. Viu and Kevin get into a fight, but the Saloon's "bouncer," Will Johnston, seizes both of them and throws them out. Viu notices a compass Will has that also has a "Sign to the West" on it. Viu later speaks with Will and his sister in their house about the Sign, which Will explains was a focal point of his father's research. Will, however, is reluctant to search for Gun Blaze West because of the massive debt the Saloon owes. Kevin appears and attacks their house, ordering Will to come out and fight him in order to prove that he is stronger. When Will is again reluctant, Viu decides to take up Kevin's challenge.

Kevin and Viu duel each other in a "target fight," where the opponent must strike a target on the other person's body without hitting him anywhere else. Viu manages to defeat Kevin, but does not kill him. When the outlaws in the saloon threaten to attack him, Will arrives, and the two destroy Carlo's saloon using Kevin's most powerful weapons. Will is persuaded to accompany Viu to Gun Blaze West after Viu pays off the debts they owe with the reward money he received for defeating Kenbrown in Illinois.

Viu and Will come across a travelling circus, where the star attraction is a young girl named Colice, who is in fact a native of Japan who had to flee the country after her home was destroyed in the Boshin War. She is an expert knife-wielder. The Ringmaster of the Circus, a large man named Rodriguez, attempts to persuade Viu (by force) that going to Gun Blaze West is a mistake, as it is a haven for outlaws and bandits, however, Viu refuses to back down. Rodriguez's old partner, Gualarippa, appears with his two sons, Uno and Dos, and they attempt to convince Rodriguez to rejoin them and travel to Gun Blaze West. Rodriguez refuses, however, and Colice and Viu defeat Uno and Dos in a battle. Gualarippa is then overpowered by Rodriguez. After Gualarippa was defeated, Colice decides to travel with Viu and Will and accompany them on their mission to make it to Gun Blaze West. 

The group then arrives in Fort Smith, Arkansas, and they learn that on July first (half way though the year), a guide will show up to take them to Gun Blaze West. The group then enters a bar. Colice asks for coffee with milk in it, but is denied because the bar "only servers adult coffee", or coffee that is black. J.J. then comes in and makes a scene to get milk for Colice. He succeeds and Colice gets her coffee. Another man comes in the bar in heavy armor, nicknamed Armor Baron, asking for a glass of milk. He is given it after making a scene. July first arrives and as it turns out, Armor Baron is the aforementioned guide. He instructs them that in order to get a seal to get to Gun Blaze West, they must first defeat him or any of his men that show up behind him. The three major characters decide that they should each take on one, but Viu decides he wants to take on the Armor Baron. 

Viu finds the Armor Baron in a fight with someone named Sarge, whose body is half artificial, called a "super soldier". Sarge is also revealed to be working with the President of the United States to find out what Gun Blaze West is like. Sarge is then defeated by the Armor Baron, but he sends up a flare which summons cavalry reinforcements. Armor Baron defeats all of them. After seeing this, Viu challenges the Armor Baron to a fight. Viu defeats Armor Baron by using a technique called Concentration One and attacking the activation device for his Gun Sack, a mechanical device that uses gunpowder to accelerate the user. In the resulting clash between Viu and the max speed Armor Baron, Marcus' gun is broken. Viu wakes up to find that since Armor Baron admitted defeat he has passed the test and earned a new gun. Viu also finds out that J.J., Colice, and Will also passed. They are then introduced to their second guide, Buffalo Hunter. Since Viu beat the Baron he is seeded first among all of the candidates that passed. The series ends with Viu writing a note to Marcus saying "Waiting for you at the place we dreamt of."

Characters

Main characters

Viu is a cheerful, optimistic, and adventurous nine-year-old boy who dreams of becoming a gunman. He acts before he thinks and, because of his rash nature, takes on risky challenges without considering the consequences. Viu is determined to become Marcus Homer's apprentice in order to become strong enough to make the journey with him to Gun Blaze West. But after Homer is killed in a duel against Ken Brown, Viu is forced to train on his own and his journey to the West doesn't begin until five years later. His weapon is a pistol, inherited from Marcus homer, that has an enhances cartridge dispenser, as well as a Sign to the west on the hilt. He demonstrates remarkable ingenuity with the weapon, learning how to "fan" all by himself, discovering the hard edges you can club someone with, and, after using up the bullets, learning to fight by recoiling the hot spent cartridges. He has been described as the Volaitional of the characters, and his youthful counterpart was derived from "Johnny boy" in the provider O commercials in Japan at the time.

Will first encountered Viu in a bar in St. Louis, where he was working as a bouncer and promptly threw both him and Target Kevin out for causing a disturbance. Will lives with his little sister in a small cabin (which was later burned down by Kevin in retaliation for the earlier incident). Later on, after defeating Target Kevin, he joins Viu in his quest to fulfill his father's dream of finding Gun Blaze West. Will is unique in that he uses a lasso as his weapon of choice instead of firearms, with his two named techniques being "Wave" (flicking a 'wave' of rope at Target Kevin's eyes) and "Tendril" (which he used four ropes to grab all of Kevin's limbs and shattered them with a powerful tug). In his training to master his "Rope Special", Will gained incredible arm strength, allowing him to toss around his opponents like weightless ragdolls when they are collared by his lassoes. He carries a trick compass that points west, with a Sign to the West emblazoned upon it. He was described as the more intellectual of the three main characters, calculating and thinking things through where the others tend to act impulsively. His intellect is proven when he states that he has memorized his father's books to the point where he can remember all that he's read from them. It is possible that he possesses a photographic memory. He was reportedly based on Quentin from October Sky.

Colice is the daughter of a family of samurai. She works as an acrobat and knifethrower for Robert Rodriguez's circus to repay him for taking her under his wing. Colice teaches Viu "Concentration One", a special eye technique to focus his aim better.

Antagonists
William Kenbrown
The first villain encountered in the series. Responsible for wounding Marcus Homer and apparently killing him, which set Viu off on his quest. Nobuhiro Watsuki acknowledged that he should have been spiced up more. He and his gang ravaged the state of Arkansas before being driven up to Winston Town. He is such an expert he can handle the local militia without even firing his gun (he hides behind his horse while they shoot, throws a whiskey bomb into the midst, and throws a set of Cartridges into the fire; while handling Marcus in a duel, he uses wrist knives to feint Marcus before shooting him twice in the torso and once in the head).
Target Kevin
An insane looking gunman who uses special sextuple-barreled shotguns to cause as much destruction as possible without regard for bystanders or property damage. After setting fire to the Johnston place to draw will out, he Fought Viu in a special "Target Fight" match, where both participants paint bull's eyes on their bodies and win by hitting their opponent's bull's eye first.
Carlo
Target Kevin's employer, the owner of the Bella Donna Saloon, he says Will's employer's Saloon is an eyesore, so he hires thugs to harass the Saloon. He tolerates all sorts of things within the Bella Donna. After Winning the Target game, Viu destroys the Saloon with the special guns provided. Carlo is known to be very generous with his money, offering will and Viu 20 times Kevin's pay, with many fringe benefits, casually.

Ex-partner of Robert Rodriguez and Father of Uno and Dos (which are also his teammates on his journey). His weapon of choice is the shield-pistol, that he wears under his hat.
Uno  Dos
Guallaripa's twin sons who are determined to help their father on his journey. Uno uses a pair of large spurs as a pair of roller skates which grant him increased speed and an added edge to his kicking attacks, while Dos uses a large circular disc as a razor edge throwing disc for long range attacks.

As a United States Army Cavalry soldier, Sarge was once noted to have fought nonstop for 3 days and 3 nights, averaging 10,000 rounds per day. He had no qualms about killing enemy soldiers even if they had surrendered or have been taken as prisoners of war. He was believed dead after he took a hit from a cannonball, but was rebuilt as a cyborg in service of the U.S. government in order to find Gun Blaze West, on orders of the President. He was meant to be the first Super Soldier.

Other characters
Cissy Bannes
Viu's older sister and the school teacher of his hometown. She despises weapons. Marcus had a crush on her.

Viu's mentor who taught him the skills needed to make it to Gun Blaze West. Believed to have been gunned down by Bill Kenbrown.
Carol Johnston
Will's helpful kid sister. She at one point risks her life to rescue Will's compass when Kevin set fire to their house. The creator acknowledged that she turned out very weak.

Circus owner. Robert is Guallaripa's former partner; their relationship ended when they caused a town's destruction and caused the deaths of a mother and daughter. Robert possess incredible strength as well as the ability to catch bullets with his bare hands. He was formerly a strong outlaw in the Territory of Utah, known as the "Western Phantom."

The First Messenger of Gun Blaze West. It is his duty to eliminate the weaker candidates to ensure the strongest make it to the next stage of the journey. His armor, Siegfried, is a special model with a built in rocket pack to give it short bursts of incredible speed, effectively turning him into a human missile. Viu manages to pierce his armor, thus earning his respect and a new Sign To West to continue his journey.
J.J.
A cocky gunman traveling to Gun Blaze West with his gang. Carries specialized bullets named Drill Lock to penetrate the armor worn by Armor Baron's men. "J.J." stands for Jesse James.
Jim
One of J.J.'s Gang. His full name is Jim Younger.
Myra
One of J.J.'s Gang and one of the only two female Gunman searching for Gun Blaze West. In real life she is Myra Maybelle Shirley Reed Starr (alias Belle Star).

Production
Gun Blaze West was written and illustrated by Nobuhiro Watsuki, who began working on it after the completion of his previous manga Rurouni Kenshin in 1999. Watsuki became inspired to write a manga about the American frontier upon visiting the Arizona desert and seeing its wild cacti.

Watsuki revealed in an interview with One Piece author Eiichiro Oda, who briefly worked for him as an assistant on Rurouni Kenshin, that he had considered making a one-eyed protagonist for Gun Blaze West. However, to avoid accusations of plagiarism from the media, Watsuki scrapped the idea when he found out that Oda had early plans to have his One Piece character Roronoa Zoro lose an eye at some point in that manga. Watsuki intentionally shortened the overall dimensions of his characters in Gun Blaze West, a technique he carried over while drawing children in his next manga Buso Renkin.

Publication
Written and illustrated by Nobuhiro Watsuki, Gun Blaze West was serialized in Shueisha's shōnen manga magazine Weekly Shōnen Jump from December 11, 2000, to July 31, 2001. Shueisha collected its chapters in three tankōbon volumes published from June 4 to November 2, 2001. Shueisha re-released the series in a two-volume bunkoban edition from August 18 to September 16, 2011.

In North America, Viz Media announced the acquisition of the manga in July 2007. The three volumes were published from April 1 to October 7, 2008. The series is also available to read on the Shonen Jump app and website.

Volume list

|}

Reception
Gun Blaze West was generally panned. Specifically, the hook was panned for being uninteresting, with multiple reviewers saying if they had been reading it weekly in Weekly Shōnen Jump, they probably would not have read beyond the first chapters. Later parts of the story were panned for being the typical shōnen plot. One reviewer even said the manga feels like "Ash Ketchum get your gun". In contrast to that, the final fight was generally praised for being an intense, over the top fight, perfect for the premature ending. 

The art was generally given mixed reviews with some critics praising it for being clean, crisp, and simple, while criticizing it for not trying anything new or spending time to appreciate the backgrounds. Carlo Santos from Anime News Network panned the art at the start, saying it felt like Watsuki had no idea what to draw. He also noted that while some characters look great in battle, out of battle they look impractical. However, he praised the angular art saying that it made it easy to follow the action from panel to panel. 

The characters were generally given mixed reviews. Some critics, like David Rasmussen from Manga Life praised the characters, calling them likeable. Other critics, like Ed Sizemore from Comics Worth Reading panned the main character, Viu, calling him "one note". However, he praised the secondary cast, specifically their involvement in the plot.

Notes

References

Further reading

External links

 
 

Adventure anime and manga
Comedy anime and manga
Comics set in the 19th century
Illinois in fiction
Nobuhiro Watsuki
Shueisha manga
Shōnen manga
Viz Media manga
Western (genre) anime and manga